Dragan Stančić (Serbian Cyrillic: Драган Станчић; born February 12, 1982), also known as "Feng Jinlong" (Chinese: 冯金龙) in China, is a Serbian football coach and former football player.

Career
Stančić has been a member of the Serbian under-19 and under-21 teams. He started his career at Red Star Belgrade before playing for OFK Belgrade and later Hajduk Kula, only to come back to where he started, at Red Star prior to the Serbian Superliga 2007-08 season.

He moved to China and joined Qingdao Jonoon in 2008.

He was part of the Serbia U-21 team that played in the 2004 UEFA European Under-21 Football Championship.

External sources
 
 Profile and stats until 2003 at Dekisa.Tripod.

Living people
1982 births
People from Obrenovac
Serbian footballers
Serbia and Montenegro under-21 international footballers
Serbian expatriate footballers
OFK Beograd players
Red Star Belgrade footballers
FK Hajduk Kula players
Serbian SuperLiga players
Qingdao Hainiu F.C. (1990) players
Nanjing Yoyo players
Guizhou F.C. players
Expatriate footballers in China
Association football midfielders
Serbian expatriate sportspeople in China
Chinese Super League players
China League One players
Expatriate football managers in China
Qingdao Hainiu F.C. (1990) managers
Serbian football managers